Alessandro Fantini (Fossacesia, 1 January 1932 — Trier, West-Germany, 5 May 1961) was an Italian professional road bicycle racer. Fantini died after a crash at the end of the sixth stage of the 1961 Tour of Germany.

Major results

1955
Tour de France:
Winner stage 12
1956
Tour de France:
Winner stage 7
Giro d'Italia:
6th place overall classification
1957
Giro d'Italia:
Winner stage 5
1960
Milano–Vignola

External links 

Official Tour de France results for Alessandro Fantini

1932 births
1961 deaths
People from Fossacesia
Italian male cyclists
Italian Tour de France stage winners
Cyclists who died while racing
Sport deaths in Germany
Cyclists from Abruzzo
Sportspeople from the Province of Chieti